Endothall (3,6-endoxohexahydrophthalic acid) is used as an herbicide for both terrestrial and aquatic plants. It is used as an aquatic herbicide for submerged aquatic plants and algae in lakes, ponds and irrigation canals. It is used as a desiccant on potatoes, hops, cotton, clover and alfalfa. It is used as a biocide to control mollusks and algae in cooling towers.

The chemical formula for endothall is C8H10O5. Its Chemical Abstracts Service (CAS) name is 7-oxabicyclo[2.2.1]heptane-2,3-dicarboxylic acid. Endothall is an organic acid but is used as the dipotassium salt or the mono-N,N-dimethylalkylamine salt.
Endothall is considered safe in drinking water by the EPA up to a maximum contaminant level of 0.1 mg/L (100 ppb). Some people who drink water contaminated by endothall above the maximum contaminant level set by the EPA for many years may experience stomach or intestinal problems.

Endothall is chemically related to cantharidin. both compounds are protein phosphatase 2A inhibitors.

See also
Cantharidin
Protein phosphatase

References 

 
 http://www.apms.org/japm/vol08a/v8p50.pdf
 http://dnr.wi.gov/lakes/plants/factsheets/EndothallFactsheet.pdf

Herbicides
Dicarboxylic acids
Ethers
Oxygen heterocycles
Phosphatase inhibitors